Artur Konontšuk (born 9 May 2000) is an Estonian professional basketball player for BC Kalev of the Estonian-Latvian Basketball League and the FIBA Europe Cup. Standing at 2.00 m (6ft 7 in), he plays at the small forward position.

Professional career
On 17 August 2021, Konontšuk signed a one-year contract with his hometown team Pärnu Sadam. In the 2021–22 KML season, he helped his team to their first Estonian League championship.

On 13 July 2022, Konontšuk signed a one-year deal with an option for one more season with BC Kalev. With Kalev, he reached FIBA Europe Cup play-offs and was the leader in efficiency during the first leg of quarter-finals.

National team career
Konontšuk made his debut for the Estonian national team on 11 November 2022, in a 2023 FIBA Basketball World Cup qualifier against Sweden.

Career statistics

College

|-
| style="text-align:left;"| 2019–20
| style="text-align:left;"| Southern Miss
| 29||20||26.3||.426|| .289 ||.711||3.6||1.0||.5|| .3 ||6.7
|-
| style="text-align:left;"| 2020–21
| style="text-align:left;"| Southern Miss
| 25 || 4 || 16.1 || .358||.317|| .571|| 2.7 ||1.0|| .2 || .2  || 4.6
|- class="sortbottom"
| style="text-align:center;" colspan="2"| Career
| 54|| 24|| 21.6 || .398|| .301|| .673|| 3.2 || 1.0 || .4 || .3 || 5.7

Awards and accomplishments
 Estonian League champion: 2022

References

External links
Artur Konontšuk at basket.ee
Artur Konontšuk at fiba.basketball

2000 births
Living people
BC Kalev/Cramo players
Estonian expatriate basketball people in the United States
Estonian men's basketball players
KK Pärnu players
Korvpalli Meistriliiga players
Small forwards
Sportspeople from Pärnu
Estonian expatriate basketball people in the Czech Republic